Juan Tepano Rano ʻa Veri ʻAmo (4 March 1867 – 8 November 1947) was a Rapa Nui leader of Easter Island. He served as an informant for Euro-American scholars on the culture and history of the island.

Family
He was born on 4 March 1867 and was of full-blood Rapa Nui descent. His father was Iovani Rano. He was raised by his grandmother (sometimes referred to as his mother) Veri ʻAmo (or Veriamo), who was born in 1830 and died in 1936 and still remembered when the islanders were able to recite the Rongorongo script.

Originally named Tepano Rano, he later adopted Juan (what he was called while he was in Chile) as a first name and used his baptismal name Tepano (Stephen) as his surname.  He was from the Tupahotu clan while his grandmother was of the Ureohei clan.

Tepano married María ‘Aifiti Engepito Ika Tetono, daughter of King Enrique Ika (r. 1900) and a member of the Miru clan.

In Chile
Tepano accompanied the last Rapa Nui King Simeon Riro Kāinga to Valparaíso in late 1898 or early 1899 to air his grievances against the Enrique Merlet company which owned much of the land with the Chilean government who had annexed Easter Island. He and two other Rapa Nui soldiers were traveling to Chile to join the Maipo Regiment of the Chilean Army. The delegation was hosted by Merlet's men Jeffries and Alfredo Rodríguez at a local tavern where the king was induced to drink heavily. The king was invited to lodge with Rodríguez while the soldiers went to their barracks. On the following day, they were informed that the king had been sent to a hospital and died of alcohol poisoning. Merlet claimed that the young king drank himself to death while Rapa Nui oral tradition asserts that he was poisoned on the orders of Merlet while he was at the hospital.

American anthropologist Grant McCall cast doubt on his military service, noting: "There is a nonsense story that he served in the Maipo regiment of the Chilean army in the War of the Pacific."

Later life

By 1901, Tepano had returned to Easter Island after serving in the Chilean Army. He was appointed by Henry Percy Edmunds, the company's manager and Chile's colonial subdelegado marítimo, as cacique, or village head in 1902. He would become the mediator for the indigenous community at Hanga Roa and the company's base at Mataveri. Officers of the Chilean Naval corvette Baquedano later attempted to proclaim him "king" in April 1911, but none of the islanders – including Tepano himself – took the ceremony seriously.

Tepano served as one of the informants and translator for the English anthropologist Katherine Routledge during her 1914–1915 Mana Expedition to Easter Island. He had a grasp of pidgin English and spoke a mixture of Spanish, English, Tahitian, and Rapa Nui. Routledge tried to learn Rongorongo from Tepano and the older islanders, but Tepano later admitted he had no knowledge of it while most of the other older residents had only secondhand knowledge of the mysterious script. It was noted that he had difficulty understanding Old Rapa Nui (the uncontaminated language spoken by the older generation) as well.

He also served as one of the informants for the Swiss anthropologist Alfred Métraux, who visited the island between 1934 and 1935.

Tepano died on 8 November 1947, at the age of 80.

See also
History of Easter Island

Notes

References

Bibliography

External links

Rapanui people
History of Easter Island
1867 births
1947 deaths
Converts to Roman Catholicism
Chilean Army personnel